Faruk Sejdini (born 7 February 1950), is an Albanian professional football coach and former player.

Club career
Sejdini had a successful albeit short career, representing Dinamo Tirana between 1966 and 1979. His career begun in 1967 in the academy when he was spotted by coach Skënder Jareci along with striker Ilir Përnaska, who become a future club legend. He was part of Dinamo's golden generation of the 1970', winning five Albanian Superliga titles and three Albanian Cups.

International career
He made his debut for Albania in a May 1971 Olympic Games qualification match against Romania and earned a total of 11 caps, scoring no goals. His final international was a November 1976 friendly match against Algeria.

International statistics
Source:

Managerial career
His last coaching experience was in 2015 when he had a brief spell with Dinamo Tirana.

Honours
Player
Albanian Superliga: 5
 1967, 1973, 1975, 1976, 1977

Albanian Cup: 3
 1971, 1974, 1978

Manager career
Albanian Superliga: 1
 2002

References

External links

1950 births
Living people
Sportspeople from Tirana
Association football defenders
Albanian footballers
Albania international footballers
FK Dinamo Tirana players
Kategoria Superiore players
Albanian football managers
FK Dinamo Tirana managers
Luftëtari Gjirokastër managers
Besa Kavajë managers
KF Apolonia Fier managers
Shkumbini Peqin managers
KF Skënderbeu Korçë managers
KF Bylis Ballsh managers
KF Elbasani managers
Kategoria Superiore managers